Bethesda Presbyterian Church is a church in McConnells, South Carolina that was built in 1820.  It was listed on the National Register of Historic Places in 1977. It was named to the National Register of Historic Places in 1977.

According to the South Carolina Department of Archives and History, "One of the oldest churches in the South Carolina Upcountry, Bethesda Presbyterian Church is also one of the four original Presbyterian churches in the state’s old York District. A mission (church) is believed to have existed as early as 1760 and Bethesda was formally organized about 1769 or 1770. From 1800 to 1863, the congregation held large camp meetings associated with the Second Great Awakening."

See also
Bethesda Presbyterian Church (Camden, South Carolina)

References

External links
Bethesda Presbyterian Church, York County (S.C. Hwy. 322, McConnells vicinity), at South Carolina Department of Archives and History

Churches on the National Register of Historic Places in South Carolina
National Register of Historic Places in York County, South Carolina
Presbyterian churches in South Carolina
Churches completed in 1820
19th-century Presbyterian church buildings in the United States
Churches in York County, South Carolina